Privilege Creek is a stream in Bandera County, Texas and Kerr County, Texas, in the United States.

Privilege Creek was so named in 1852 when a pioneer remarked it would be a "privilege" to settle at such a fine spot.

See also
List of rivers of Texas

References

Rivers of Bandera County, Texas
Rivers of Kerr County, Texas
Rivers of Texas